Salihköy is a village in the Ömerli District of Mardin Province in Turkey. The village is populated by Arabs and had a population of 425 in 2021.

References 

Villages in Ömerli District
Arab settlements in Mardin Province